American country music singer Justin Moore has released six studio albums, two extended plays, and twenty singles. Moore signed with Valory Music Group in 2007, and his first radio single, "Back That Thing Up", entered the Hot Country Songs chart in 2008. The next year, his single, "Small Town USA", became his first single to enter the Billboard Hot 100.

Moore released his first extended play (EP), The "You Asked for It" EP, in 2009. His self-titled debut album was released later that year; it produced the singles "Back That Thing Up", "Small Town USA", "Backwoods", and "How I Got to Be This Way" and has been certified platinum by the Recording Industry Association of America (RIAA). His second album, Outlaws Like Me, released in 2011, produced the singles "If Heaven Wasn't So Far Away", "Bait a Hook", and "Til My Last Day", and was also certified platinum by the RIAA. His third album, 2013's Off the Beaten Path, has been certified gold by the RIAA, and produced three singles, including "Lettin' the Night Roll", which topped the Country Airplay chart. Two further albums, Kinda Don't Care and Late Nights and Longnecks, were released in 2016 and 2019, respectively. Those two albums have produced five singles, including four which have charted at the number one position on the Country Airplay chart: "You Look Like I Need a Drink" and "Somebody Else Will" from Kinda Don't Care, and "The Ones That Didn't Make It Back Home" and "Why We Drink", from Late Nights and Longnecks.

nine of Moore's singles have reached the Number 1 position on Billboards Hot Country Songs and/or Country Airplay charts. Three of these have been certified platinum by the RIAA. In addition, Moore has charted ten songs on the Billboard Hot 100 chart, eight singles on the Canada Country chart (including "You Look Like I Need a Drink" at number one), and seven songs on Canadian Hot 100 chart.

Studio albums

Extended plays

Singles

As lead artist

As featured artist

Other charted songs

Music videos

Notes

References 

Country music discographies
Discographies of American artists